Randi Lindtner Næss (11 May 1905 – 20 May 2009) was a Norwegian actress and singer.

Biography
She was the daughter of Ragnvald Andreas Lindtner (1879–1966) and Thea Johanne Olsen (1884–1973). 
She was the mother of actor Arne Lindtner Næss. Through her daughter, Berit Næss, she was mother-in-law to film actor Rolf Søder (1918–1998) .

Næss made her stage debut at Den Nationale Scene in 1928, and was employed there until 1974 and then continued as a freelancer. 
She  often appeared in plays by Ludvig Holberg and was frequently featured  in operettas and comedies. 
Her last stage job was in 1991. She died in 2009, nine days after her 104th birthday.

References

Norwegian stage actresses
Norwegian centenarians
Actors from Bergen
1905 births
2009 deaths
Women centenarians